Arung Palakka, or La Tenritatta to Unru' (1634 or 16351696) was a 17th-century Bugis prince and warrior. He supported the Dutch East India Company (VOC) in the Makassar War (1666–1669) against the Gowa Sultanate in his native South Sulawesi (today part of Indonesia). After the defeat of Gowa, he became the King of Bone and South Sulawesi's most powerful man.

Biography 
Arung Palakka was born in 1634 or 1635 in the village of Lamatta, Mario-ri Wawo, Soppeng. His father was LaPottobune Arung Tana Tenga, a minor lord in Soppeng, and his mother was Datu Mario-ri Wawo We Tenrisui, granddaughter of the first Muslim ruler of Bone. Soppeng and Bone were autonomous principalities in South Sulawesi under the hegemony of the Gowa Sultanate. As a child he was known as LaTenritatta, "He who cannot be struck". In the 1646 Battle of Passempe, Bone was defeated by the Gowa Sultanate and his family became hostages living in Gowa. The family served under the Chief Minister (Tuma'bicarra butta) of Gowa, Karaeng Pattingalloang, who liked Arung Palakka and gave him a proper upbringing as a prince.

Rise to power and reign 

In 1660 Bone rose in rebellion against Gowa, and Palakka became one of its leaders, together with the Gowa-appointed regent of Bone, Tobala'. By August 1660 the army under Palakka's command grew to 10,000 men. The rebellion was ultimately crushed, and Palakka fled South Sulawesi. In 1663 he settled in Batavia, which was under control of the Dutch East India Company (VOC). Subsequently, he allied himself with the VOC in the Makassar War against Sultan Hasanuddin of Gowa. Palakka's participation was an essential part of the VOC's plan. His arrival prompted the Bugis of Bone and Soppeng to rise in rebellion against Gowa. While the VOC fleet, under Cornelis Speelman, fought the Gowa fleet, Palakka led a "difficult" land campaign in South Sulawesi. The war ended in the victory of the VOC and Palakka's Bugis forces.

Following the victory against Gowa, Palakka became the most powerful man in South Sulawesi until his death in 1696. In 1672 he was formally given the title of arung (king) of Bone, and Bone replaced Gowa as the supreme principality in South Sulawesi. He and the VOC arranged a division of power, with Palakka dominating internal affairs and the VOC dominating external affairs. During his reign, he ignored the pre-existing consultative system of government and instead governed with authoritarian rule supported by warriors loyal to him. He led a series of campaigns to ensure his domination in South Sulawesi. His value as a military ally and his personal ties with Speelman (later VOC Governor-General) ensured continued support from the VOC.

Trunajaya campaign 

The defeat of Gowa and the subsequent Palakka–VOC rule prompted an outflow of people from South Sulawesi. Notably, some of these refugees settled in Java and joined forces with the Madurese prince Trunajaya in the Trunajaya rebellion against the Mataram Sultanate. The rebellion almost caused Mataram's collapse until the VOC intervened on behalf of Mataram. Arung Palakka aided his VOC allies and led a Bugis army in suppressing the rebellion.

Legacy 
Indonesians today, especially those from Makassar, view the Makassar War and Arung Palakka's role in it with bitterness. Palakka is seen as a traitor who allied himself with the colonialist VOC to conquer the Gowa Sultanate, his fellow Indonesians, and a truly Indonesian polity.

Notes

References

Citations

Bibliography 
 
 
 
 

1634 births
1696 deaths
Bugis people
History of Sulawesi
Indonesian royalty